Elida may refer to:

Elida (given name)

Places
 Elida, New Mexico, a town in Roosevelt County, New Mexico, United States
 Elida, Ohio, a village in Allen County, Ohio, United States
 Elida, Illinois,  unincorporated community in Winnebago County, Illinois, United States

Other
 Elida High School, a high school in Elida, Ohio, United States
 Hurricane Elida (disambiguation), several tropical cyclones in the Eastern Pacific Ocean
 Elida (ship), Christian performance mega yacht, mission ship in Sweden

See also